Emily (Émilie in the original) is a cartoon that often aired on the Nickelodeon children's variety show, Pinwheel. The cartoon follows the adventures of Emily, a little girl who wears only red.

Emily has a pet hedgehog named Humphrey (Arthur in the French version). Other characters include Emily's cousins Alexander and Nicholas, her English friend Gregory, her friend Chloe, her little sister Pat (Elise in France), her big brother Stephen and his friends William and Sydney.

The episodes show Emily facing her fears (fear of the dark, bed-wetting, and the hospital), managing relationships (jealousy of her sister), as well as playing and having fun (playing hide-and-seek, going to the circus).

The author and illustrator of Émilie, Domitille de Pressensé, is French and specializes in children's books.

A remake of the series done in CGI was released in 2012, consisting of 52 episodes.

References

Links and references
 IMDB entry on Émilie

1979 French television series debuts
1979 French television series endings
French television shows based on children's books
France 2
French children's animated television series
1970s French animated television series
2012 French television series debuts
2010s French animated television series
Animated television series about children